John Wight may refer to:
Sean Wight, née John Wight (1964–2011), Australian rules footballer
John Wight, contributor to London Progressive Journal

See also
John White (disambiguation)